Limnoria is a genus of isopods from the family Limnoriidae.

Species

Limnoria agrostisa Cookson, 1991
Limnoria algarum Menzies, 1957
Limnoria andamanensis Rao & Ganapati, 1969
Limnoria antarctica Pfeffer, 1887
Limnoria bacescui Ortiz & Lalana, 1988
Limnoria bituberculata Pillai, 1957
Limnoria bombayensis Pillai, 1961
Limnoria borealis Kussakin, 1963
Limnoria carinata Menzies & Becker, 1957
Limnoria carptora Cookson, 1997
Limnoria chilensis Menzies, 1962
Limnoria clarkae Kensley & Schotte, 1987
Limnoria convexa Cookson, 1991
Limnoria cristata Cookson & Cragg, 1991
Limnoria echidna Cookson, 1991
Limnoria emarginata Kussakin & Malyutina, 1989
Limnoria foveolata Menzies, 1957
Limnoria gibbera Cookson, 1991
Limnoria glaucinosa Cookson, 1991
Limnoria hicksi Schotte, 1989
Limnoria indica Becker & Kampf, 1958
Limnoria insulae Menzies, 1957
Limnoria japonica Richardson, 1909
Limnoria kautensis Cookson & Cragg, 1988
Limnoria lignorum Rathke, 1799
Limnoria loricata Cookson, 1991
Limnoria magadanensis Jesakova, 1961
Limnoria mazzellae Cookson & Lorenti, 2001
Limnoria multipunctata Menzies, 1957
Limnoria nonsegnis Menzies, 1957
Limnoria orbellum Cookson, 1991
Limnoria pfefferi Stebbing, 1904
Limnoria platycauda Menzies, 1957
Limnoria poorei Cookson, 1991
Limnoria quadripunctata Holthuis, 1949
Limnoria raruslima Cookson, 1991
Limnoria reniculus Schotte, 1989
Limnoria rugosissima Menzies, 1957
Limnoria saseboensis Menzies, 1957
Limnoria segnis Chilton, 1883
Limnoria segnoides Menzies, 1957
Limnoria sellifera Cookson et al., 2012
Limnoria septima Barnard, 1936
Limnoria sexcarinata Kuhne, 1975
Limnoria simulata Menzies, 1957
Limnoria stephenseni Menzies, 1957
Limnoria sublittorale Menzies, 1957
Limnoria torquisa Cookson, 1991
Limnoria tripunctata Menzies, 1951
Limnoria tuberculata Sowinsky, 1884
Limnoria uncapedis Cookson, 1991
Limnoria unicornis Menzies, 1957
Limnoria zinovae (Kussakin, 1963)

See also
 Gribble

References

Isopod genera